Christopher Jason van der Drift (born 8 March 1986) is a New Zealand racing driver of Dutch descent.

Career
Van der Drift started karting at the age of 7 and in 1994 he raced his first year in cadets. From there he went on to win 6 New Zealand Championships and 6 North Island Championships until 2002.

After ten years of kart racing in New Zealand and also competing in Australia for two years in 2001 JICA and 2002 Ford Kart Stars (finishing both championships in 6th), he had to take the step into racing cars. At the time he had no sponsors so it was difficult just to step into a car as his parents didn't have enough to fund that as well.

Racing record

Karting career summary

Racing career summary

† Team standings. 

‡ As van der Drift was a guest driver, he was ineligible to score points.

Complete New Zealand Grand Prix results

Complete GP2 Series results

Complete GP2 Asia Series results
(key) (Races in bold indicate pole position) (Races in italics indicate fastest lap)

Complete A1 Grand Prix results
(key)

Complete Formula Renault 3.5 Series results
(key) (Races in bold indicate pole position) (Races in italics indicate fastest lap)

Superleague Formula
(key) (Races in bold indicate pole position) (Races in italics indicate fastest lap)

‡ Chris van der Drift qualified for the Super Final at Brands Hatch but was unable to compete due to suffering injuries from a large crash in race two which led to him being taken to hospital with a broken ankle, two broken ribs, a cracked shoulder blade, a dislocated shoulder and two broken fingers. His Super Final place was taken up by the seventh highest points-scorer of the weekend, Yelmer Buurman.

† Non Championship round

Complete Auto GP World Series results
(key) (Races in bold indicate pole position) (Races in italics indicate fastest lap)

Complete Bathurst 12 Hour results

Complete Stock Car Brasil results

Supercars Championship results

Bathurst 1000 results

References

External links
 
 
 Profile on Racing Reference

1986 births
Living people
Sportspeople from Hamilton, New Zealand
New Zealand people of Dutch descent
New Zealand racing drivers
Olympiacos CFP (Superleague Formula team) drivers
Formula BMW ADAC drivers
Formula Renault 2.0 NEC drivers
Formula Renault Eurocup drivers
Toyota Racing Series drivers
International Formula Master drivers
GP2 Asia Series drivers
A1 Team New Zealand drivers
World Series Formula V8 3.5 drivers
Superleague Formula drivers
Auto GP drivers
International GT Open drivers
V8SuperTourer drivers
Blancpain Endurance Series drivers
24 Hours of Spa drivers
People educated at Hamilton Boys' High School
Stock Car Brasil drivers
ADAC GT Masters drivers
Bhaitech drivers
Manor Motorsport drivers
MP Motorsport drivers
Team Rosberg drivers
JD Motorsport drivers
Trident Racing drivers
Epsilon Euskadi drivers
Tasman Motorsports drivers
Drivex drivers
A1 Grand Prix drivers
Super Nova Racing drivers
Boutsen Ginion Racing drivers
Craft-Bamboo Racing drivers
Lamborghini Super Trofeo drivers
Porsche Carrera Cup Germany drivers